Herby Stare is a Polish railway station, located north of the Upper Silesian Industrial Area, along the major Częstochowa - Lubliniec line, in the Lubliniec County of the Silesian Voivodeship. Less than 2 kilometres northeast lies its twin station Herby Nowe, located along the Polish Coal Trunk-Line line. Both stations are connected with each other by a line built in 1926.

See also 
 Gmina Herby

External links 
 A webpage about Herby Nowe and Herby Stare junction

Railway stations in Silesian Voivodeship
Lubliniec County